Lindsay Geoffrey Whittle is a Welsh Plaid Cymru politician who was a  Member of the Welsh Assembly (AM) for the South Wales East region from 2011 to 2016.

Political career
Whittle was born in Caerphilly in South Wales, and lives in Abertridwr, Caerphilly. He repeatedly won local council elections since he entered politics in 1976, while working for several decades as a housing manager in Cardiff.  He was first elected Leader of Caerphilly County Borough Council between 1999 and 2004, and a second time in from 2008 to 2011. He is also the Welsh Local Government Association's spokesperson on Equalities, Community Safety and Social Justice.  
He stood in every Welsh Assembly election since its formation in 1999, and eight times for the Westminster Parliament seat of Caerphilly. In 2011 he was elected as Assembly Member for South Wales East in the National Assembly for Wales.

Following his election to the Welsh Assembly, Whittle stood down as leader of Caerphilly County Borough Council, but remained as a backbench councillor, he was re-elected as a councillor in 2012, 2017 and 2022. Whittle was elected the party's leader on Caerphilly council after the 2022 local elections, with Plaid Cymru being the largest opposition group on the council.

Electoral performance
Whittle has contested several elections under the Plaid Cymru banner:

Offices held

|-

References

1951 births
Living people
Members of Mid Glamorgan County Council
People from Caerphilly
Plaid Cymru members of the Senedd
Wales AMs 2011–2016